Cormocephalus westwoodi is a species of centipedes in the family Scolopendridae. The species was previously considered by many names in many regions of the world, where some synonyms are still exists valid in certain countries. Five subspecies are currently recognized.

Subspecies
Cormocephalus westwoodi anceps
Cormocephalus westwoodi lambertoni
Cormocephalus westwoodi nubigenus
Cormocephalus westwoodi ribauti
Cormocephalus westwoodi westwoodi

Ecology and description
Like other bark centipedes, C. westwoodi also prefer to live under rocks, barks and litter. It is the largest centipede found in Tasmania, reaching 60 mm in length. It is also used as a pet in Oceanian countries. The species often confused with Cormocephalus aurantiipes.

References

Newport G. (1844). A list of the species of Myriapoda order Chilopoda contained in the cabinets of the British Museum with synoptic descriptions of forty-seven new species - Annals and Magazine of Natural History, 13: 94-101, see p. 100.
Schileyko A.A., Stagl V. (2004). The collection of scolopendromorph centipedes (Chilopoda) in the Natural History Museum in Vienna: a critical re-evaluation of former taxonomic identifications - Annalen des Naturhistorischen Museums in Wien, Serie B, 105B: 67-137, see p. 81.

westwoodi
Animals described in 1844
Centipedes of Australia